Carl (Karl) Ruben (born 4 August 1903, died 28 October 1938) was a Danish chess master.

He won a match against Johannes Pedersen (1.5–0.5) at Aalborg 1927, tied for 2nd-3rd in Danish Championship at Vordingborg  1927 (Erik Andersen won), shared 2nd at Copenhagen 1927 (Politiken, Géza Maróczy won),
tied for 5-6th at Copenhagen 1928 (Aron Nimzowitsch won), tied for 7-9th at Svendborg 1930 (DEN-ch, Andersen won), and won a simultan game against Alexander Alekhine at Copenhagen 1930.

Ruben played four times for Denmark in Chess Olympiads in 1927, 1928, 1930, 1931, and won team silver medal at London 1927.

References

1903 births
Danish Jews
Danish chess players
Jewish chess players
Chess Olympiad competitors
Year of death missing